Pyncostola variegata is a moth of the family Gelechiidae. It was described by Anthonie Johannes Theodorus Janse in 1950. It is found in South Africa, where it has been recorded from the Western Cape.

References

Endemic moths of South Africa
Moths described in 1950
Pyncostola